This is a list of French words, terms and phrases of English language origin, some of a specialist nature, in common usage in the French language or at least within their specialist area.

Modern English is rarely considered a source language as it is itself a mixture of other languages. Culturally, the creation of new words is widely accepted and there is no official body that is treated as the guardian of the language. Each dictionary producer makes their own editorial decisions and there is a slight impetus towards adding new words as this often results in media coverage and public discussion.

Conversely, the Académie française as an institution absolutely guards the French language. This hurdle in the creation of new words allows time and space for English neologisms to enter common usage in the French language. In many cases, l'Académie publishes French alternatives or creates French neologisms, however these words often fail to achieve the public traction which, by definition has to have been achieved by the English word for it to be noticed by l'Académie in the first place.

In nearly all cases the words in this list are not sanctioned by the Académie française.

Words in accepted use

The following words are commonly used and included in French dictionaries.

 le pull: E. pullover, sweater, jersey.
 le shampooing, the shampoo
 le scoop, in the context of a news story or as a simile based on that context. While the word is in common use, the Académie française recommends a French synonym, "exclusivité".
 le selfie. The word was included in French dictionary "Le Petit Robert" in 2015, along with "hashtag".
 le sandwich
 le bulldozer
 l'email / le mail
 cool: great, cool, [expression of approval].
 le dressing. A dressing room or walk-in closet.
 fun: amusing, entertaining, bonvivant.
 le hashtag
 l'after-shave
 le blog
 le chewing-gum: chewing gum; American.
 le lifting: facelift, plastic surgery.
 le parking. A car park
 le weekend: weekend 
 people: c'est très people... ("it's very popular/about personalities").
 versatile. A word with slightly different meaning in French and English. The English usage, meaning 'with a variety of uses' has crept into common French usage.

Pseudo-anglicisms
Source:
 le zapping. Channel surfing on a television
 le rugbyman, le tennisman. Rugby and tennis player
 les baskets. Sports shoes
 babyfoot. Table football
 le flipper. A pinball machine
 le smoking. A dinner suit / tuxedo
 le footing. Running or jogging

Gallicized English words
 la redingote. A type of coat. From the English, "Riding Coat". Amusingly, this French version crossed back into English in the 18th century, though it is not in common usage today.

Colloquialisms and neologisms

Technology
 Tweeter. To tweet.
 Forwarder. To forward an email
 Liker. To like an update or posting, typically on Facebook
 Skyper
 Le buzz
 La box. Modem provided by most Internet Providers.
 Le hot spot. In terms of Wi-Fi availability.

Business
 Au black. In reference to the black market or black economy
 L’open space
 Booster. To boost, as in "booster ma carriere"
 Voyager low-cost. Low-cost travel
 Le drive. In reference to drive-through food takeaway services
 High tech
 Le challenge. An example of an English word of French origin being backported into French, with the English spelling and pronunciation

Sports
 Le corner - a corner kick.
 Le coach. In a sporting context
 Le penalty - a penalty kick
 Le goal - a goal keeper

Arts and entertainment
 La punch line
 Le biopic
 Infotainment
 Le come back. In the sense of a celebrity, sportsperson or entertainer making a comeback.

Others
 Un Black. A way to designate a black person.
 Le box. Typically a room sized storage unit
 Le relooking. In reference to a makeover
 Bruncher. To brunch
 Le lifting. In reference to plastic surgery
 La success story. An example of an English phrase made up of words of French origin being reinfused into the French language in the English context.
 Le dealer. Specifically of illegal drugs.
 Le cheese. In the context of "Le Royale Cheese" in McDonald's. If one orders "un cheese" one receives a cheeseburger.
 Le Brexit
 No stress
 Switcher. To change or swap.

See also
Joual#English loanwords (Anglicisms)

References

English
French